Anna De Weert, née Cogen; Anna Virginie Caroline De Weert (27 May 1867 – 12 May 1950) was a Belgian painter. She would paint in the Luminist style.

Life
Weert was born in Ghent as Anna Virginie Caroline Cogen. Her family were prosperous with a high regard for nature, art and in particular watercolours. Her grandfather was the writer Karel Lodewijk Ledeganck and her uncles, Alphons and Felix Cogen, were successful painters. Her father died when she was two so she grew up in the care of her extended family and in particular her mother and grandmother.

Each summer she was taken to the family's home at Menton in the South of France. This summer holiday became an annual tradition all her life. She first formally studied art at the Academy of Ghent. In 1891 she married, who was a politician.

In the 1890s she was a private (pro bono) student of the Belgian painter Emile Claus. She and her husband  spent summers with him in the 1890s. In 1895 she acquired a new studio as she had bought a farm at Afsnee near Ghent, beside the river Lys, which had belonged to a Dominican Monastery. 

Claus painted her in a river scene in 1899. She recorded what her own studio in Afsnee looked like in about 1909.

Anna Cogen was a productive artist and had a long association with the Cercle Artistique et Littéraire in her home town after she first exhibited there in 1895.

Death and legacy
She died in Ghent in 1950. In her will she left the painting of her to the museum in Ghent together with a work by George Minne and two old masters.

References 

1867 births
1950 deaths
Artists from Ghent
Belgian painters
19th-century Belgian women artists
20th-century Belgian women artists
19th-century Belgian painters
20th-century Belgian painters
Belgian women painters